Pachydyptes is an extinct genus of penguin. It contains the single species Pachydyptes ponderosus, the New Zealand giant penguin. This taxon is known from a few bones from Late Eocene (37 to 34 MYA) rocks in the area of Otago, which were found in two clades near a base of a tree (Ksepka et al., 2006).

G.G. Simpson, an evolutionary biologist, estimated a height of 140 to 160 cm (about 5 ft) and a weight of around 80 to possibly over 100 kg (Stonehouse, 1975). it was the second-tallest penguin ever, surpassed only by Anthropornis nordenskjoeldi in height, but probably not in weight. This was because of the clade's evolutionary history, where many early penguins were typically found larger in size (Ksepka et al., 2006).

G.G. Simpson had also claimed from the fossil records that the Pachydyptes along with many other early penguin species, descended from flying ancestors (Stonehouse, 1975).

Pachydyptes was slightly larger than Icadyptes salasi, the best-identified of the giant penguins.

References
 Ksepka, D., Bertelli, S., & Giannini, N. (2006, October). The phylogeny of the living and fossil Sphenisciformes (penguins). Cladistics, 22(5), 412–441. Web of Science.
Oliver, Walter R. B. (1930). [Genus Pachydyptes]. In: New Zealand birds, 85–86. Wellington: Fine Arts.
Stonehouse, B. (1975). The Biology of Penguins. In Science (Vol. 189, pp. 448–452).

External links
 Wikinews: Students find fossilised giant penguin
 Geocities Geocities NatureLand 5218: Information and good reconstruction 

Eocene birds
Extinct birds of New Zealand
Fossil taxa described in 1930
Palaeeudyptinae
Extinct penguins
Fossils of New Zealand
Prehistoric bird genera
Extinct monotypic bird genera